The 1970 Law on Social Danger and Rehabilitation (la ley de peligrosidad y rehabilitación social) was a Spanish penal code law approved by dictator Francisco Franco's regime on August 5, 1970. It replaced the 1933 Law on Vagrants and Criminals (la ley de vagos y maleantes) which sought to punish and exclude "antisocial" members of society, such as beggars, vandals, drug traffickers, pornographers, prostitutes, pimps and illegal immigrants. Although the jurisdiction of the Law of Vagrants and Criminals was officially extended in 1954 to include homosexuals as "antisocial" members of society, the law never targeted them specifically. The Law of Danger and Social Rehabilitation went a step further than the Law of Vagrants and Criminals, specifically criminalizing homosexuality and establishing a spectrum of punishments for citizens caught engaged in homosexual acts. The law was passed in 1970, just a year after the Stonewall Uprising in New York City, whose legacy set into motion a series of gay rights movements around the world.

Punishments and prosecution 
Under the Law on Social Danger and Rehabilitation, official punishments for homosexuality included internment in rehabilitation establishments for periods lasting between six months and five years, exclusion from visiting certain public spaces or from living in specific neighborhoods, and possible prison time. The regime justified these conditions by framing homosexuality as a disease and popularizing a discourse centered on the "inherent perversion" of homosexuals, who were painted as a threat to society, and particularly to young people. The law perpetuated a widespread fear of public scandal and political persecution throughout the queer community of Spain. It is speculated that Spanish poet Federico García Lorca was assassinated for a double crime of being homosexual and having radical beliefs that contradicted those of Franco's regime.

Post-Francoist Spain 
Even after Franco's death, Spanish legislation often did not work in favor of the rights of the queer community. The 1975 general pardon and the 1977 amnesty law did not extend to those citizens who had been punished under the Law of Social Danger and Rehabilitation.  Along with the ratification of a new democratic constitution in Spain on November 6, 1978, the Law of Social Danger was overturned, as Judge Miguel Lopéz Muñiz argued that it was a "product of the Franquista regime," but many homosexual prisoners were not released until a year later, in 1979.  In January 1979, several articles of the law were repealed, among them one referring to "acts of homosexuality," and ultimately the law's full repeal was achieved in 1989. Ten years later, on December 13, 1999, the third additional provision of the Organic Law on Protection of Personal Data 15/1999, established that the police files of all those repressed by this law would be declared confidential, and only historians would be able to access their data for statistical purposes.

References 

LGBT-related legislation
Legal history of Spain
1995 in Spain
1989 in Spain
1979 in Spain
1970 in Spain
Lesbian history in Spain